"Sir Duke" is a song composed and performed by Stevie Wonder from his 1976 album Songs in the Key of Life. Released as a single in 1977, the track topped the U.S. Billboard Hot 100 and Black Singles charts, and reached number two in the UK Singles Chart, his joint biggest hit there at the time. Billboard ranked it as the No. 18 song of 1977.

The song was written in tribute to Duke Ellington, the influential jazz legend who had died in 1974. The lyrics also refer to Count Basie, Glenn Miller, Louis Armstrong and Ella Fitzgerald.

Wonder re-recorded the song for the 1995 live album Natural Wonder.

Background 
Wonder wrote the song as a tribute to Duke Ellington, the jazz composer, bandleader, and pianist who had influenced him as a musician. Wonder had already experienced the death of two of his idols (Dinah Washington and Wes Montgomery) after attempting to collaborate with them.

After Ellington died in 1974, Wonder wanted to write a song acknowledging musicians he felt were important. He later said, "I knew the title from the beginning but wanted it to be about the musicians who did something for me. So soon they are forgotten. I wanted to show my appreciation."

Wonder pays tribute to "some of music's pioneers" in the song: "There's Basie, Miller, Satchmo, and the king of all, Sir Duke / And with a voice like Ella's ringing out / There's no way the band can lose".

Wonder recorded other tributes to people he admired, including the 1980 songs "Master Blaster", dedicated to Bob Marley, and "Happy Birthday", which pleaded for what would eventually become the Martin Luther King Jr. Day holiday in the United States.

Reception
Cash Box said that "it's a tribute to jazz and roots, with a beat that lies somewhere between jazz and funk, and a horn section that dances on winged feet."  Record World said upon its single release: "Already familiar from its radio play and already on The Singles Chart, it is shaping up as a major hit."  New York Times critic John Rockwell said that it's "not Wonder's most compelling song, but nice that it should be so popular."

Charts and certifications

Weekly charts

Year-end charts

Certifications

Personnel

Produced, written, arranged and composed by Stevie Wonder
Vocals, Fender Rhodes electric piano, and percussion by Stevie Wonder
Trumpets by Raymond Maldonado and Steve Madaio
Drums by Raymond Pounds
Bass guitar by Nathan Watts
Lead guitar by Michael Sembello
Rhythm guitar by Ben Bridges
Alto saxophone by Hank Redd
Tenor saxophone by Trevor Lawrence

References

External links
 List of cover versions of "Sir Duke" at SecondHandSongs.com

Stevie Wonder songs
1977 singles
1977 songs
Billboard Hot 100 number-one singles
Cashbox number-one singles
Commemoration songs
Songs written by Stevie Wonder
Motown singles
Tamla Records singles
Songs about jazz
Songs about musicians
Cultural depictions of Louis Armstrong
Cultural depictions of Duke Ellington
Cultural depictions of jazz musicians
RPM Top Singles number-one singles